Stephanie Mazen Yousef Al-Naber (born 27 October 1988) is a Jordanian footballer who plays as a midfielder for Jordan Women's Football League club Shabab Al-Ordon and captains the Jordan national team.

Club career
Al-Naber learned to play football in the street with her family. She later played on her school's team and began her career with Shabab Al-Ordon, one of the first Jordanian clubs in the country to start a women's team.

Al-Naber later became the first Jordanian woman to play football in leagues abroad. She played for clubs in Denmark, the United Arab Emirates, and Lebanon.

International career 
Al-Naber has been a main-stay of the Jordan women's national team since its inception in 2005.

She helped the national team win the West Asian Football Federation Women's Championship in 2005, 2007, and 2014 as well as the 2010 Arabia Women's Cup. Al-Naber was part of the Jordan national squads that played in the 2006, 2010, and 2014 Asian Games.

She was also part of the squad that participated in the 2014 AFC Women's Asian Cup qualifiers helping Jordan qualify for the continental tournament for the first time.

Personal life
As of January 2017, Al-Naber's father is a director at Shabab Al-Ordon. Both her siblings, Yousef and Natasha, are footballers.

Career statistics

International goals

References

External links 
 
 
 Stephanie Al-Naber at the Jordan Football Association

1988 births
Living people
Jordanian women's footballers
Jordan women's international footballers
Sportspeople from Amman
Women's association football midfielders
Footballers at the 2006 Asian Games
Footballers at the 2010 Asian Games
Footballers at the 2014 Asian Games
Jordanian expatriate footballers
Jordanian expatriates in Denmark
Expatriate women's footballers in Denmark
Jordanian expatriate sportspeople in the United Arab Emirates
Expatriate  footballers in the United Arab Emirates
Jordanian expatriate sportspeople in Lebanon
Expatriate women's footballers in Lebanon
Fortuna Hjørring players
Jordanian women's futsal players
Asian Games competitors for Jordan
Sadaka SC women's footballers
Lebanese Women's Football League players
Jordan Women's Football League players
FIFA Century Club